Horst Möhwald (born 1 June 1938) is a German skier. He competed in the Nordic combined event at the 1964 Winter Olympics.

References

External links
 

1938 births
Living people
People from Trutnov District
Sudeten German people
German male Nordic combined skiers
Olympic Nordic combined skiers of the United Team of Germany
Nordic combined skiers at the 1964 Winter Olympics